Pink is the sixth studio album by British electronic musician Kieran Hebden, released under his alias Four Tet on 20 August 2012 by Text Records. The album primarily comprises tracks that had already been issued as 12-inch singles; only "Lion" and "Peace for Earth" were previously unreleased.

Pink reached number 74 on the UK Albums Chart.

Track listing

Charts

References

Four Tet albums
2012 albums
Albums produced by Kieran Hebden
Text Records albums